Ship Ahoy! (Swedish: Skepp ohoj!) is a 1931 Swedish comedy film directed by Gustaf Edgren and starring Fridolf Rhudin, Weyler Hildebrand and Brita Appelgren. It was shot at the Råsunda Studios in Stockholm and on location in Gothenburg. The film's sets were designed by the art director Arne Åkermark.

Cast
 Fridolf Rhudin as 	Fridolf Svensson
 Weyler Hildebrand as 	Julius Göransson
 Brita Appelgren as Mary 
 Edvin Adolphson as 	Alvarado de Gotho 
 Georg Blomstedt as Lövgren, Karlshamn's chief of police
 Erik Bergman as 	Captain on 'Ingeborg'
 Wilhelm Högstedt as 	Captain on 'Fritiof' 
 Yngve Nyqvist as Detective
 Nils Ekstam as 	Detective
 Carl Andersson as 	Man 
 Helge Andersson as Man 
 Anna-Lisa Berg as 	Girl selling chocolate 
 Gunnar Björnstrand as Young man 
 Rulle Bohman as 	Rulle, sailor 
 Berns De Reaux as 	Black man 
 Bertil Ehrenmark as 	Sailor on 'Ingeborg' 
 Göran Eklund as 	Sailor on 'Ingeborg' 
 Einar Fagstad as 	Rikard, sailor 
 Emil Fjellström as 	Guest at Restaurant
 Ludde Gentzel as 	Sailor on 'Ingeborg' 
 Eric Gustafson as Tied and burgled man
 Paul Hagman as 	Man
 Frithiof Hedvall as 	Constable Bäsk 
 Olle Hilding as 	Waitor 
 Maja Jerlström as 	Girl 
 Ludde Juberg as 	Jimmy, black man 
 Bo Korfitzen as 	Bartender 
 Olof Krook as 	Man in the bar 
 Herman Lantz as 	Guest on Restaurant Grand Fall 
 Helge Mauritz as 	Steward on 'Fritiof' 
 John Melin as 	Bartender 
 Thor Modéen as 	Editor 
 Doris Nelson as 	Rosita 
 Nils Nordståhl as 	Young man 
 Rutger Nygren as 	Young man 
 Dagny Ohlson as 	Girl 
 Werner Ohlson as 	Police trainee 
 Olav Riégo as 	Ljungborg, editor 
 Oscar Rosander as 	Man 
 Aina Rosén as 	Betty 
 Svea Svensson as 	Girl 
 John Wahlbom as 	Man in the bar 
 Edith Wallén as 	Mary's mother 
 Birgit Widerbäck as 	Girl 
 Lisa Wirström as Woman

References

Bibliography 
 Qvist, Per Olov & von Bagh, Peter. Guide to the Cinema of Sweden and Finland. Greenwood Publishing Group, 2000.

External links 
 

1931 films
Swedish comedy films
1931 comedy films
1930s Swedish-language films
Swedish black-and-white films
Films directed by Gustaf Edgren
1930s Swedish films